Kwesi Paul (born 11 July 1994) is a Grenadian professional footballer who plays as a centre-back for the Peachtree City, and the Grenada national team.

Career
Beginning his career with his local T.A. Marryshow Community College, Paul moved to Camerhogne before moving to the United States with his college team the LSU–Alexandria Generals. The next year, he moved to Brewton–Parker College where he represented their soccer team, the Barons, and was their assistant coach for the 2020–21 season.

International career
Paul made his debut with the Grenada in 1–0 2022 FIFA World Cup qualification loss to Antigua and Barbuda on 4 June 2021. He was called up to represent Grenada at the 2021 CONCACAF Gold Cup.

References

External links
 
 LSU Generals Profile
 USL League Two Profile

1994 births
Living people
People from Saint John Parish, Grenada
Grenadian footballers
Grenada international footballers
LSU–Alexandria Generals men's soccer players
USL League Two players
Association football defenders
Grenadian expatriate footballers
Grenadian expatriate sportspeople in the United States
Expatriate soccer players in the United States
2021 CONCACAF Gold Cup players